Syedna Sheikh Adam Safiuddin (died on 7 Rajab 1030 AH AH/1622 AD; born on 6th Jumad-il-Akhar [unknown year], Ahmedabad, India) was the 28th Da'i al-Mutlaq (Absolute Missionary) of the Tayyibi sect of Musta‘lī Islam.  He succeeded the 27th Dai Syedna Dawood Bin Qutubshah to the religious post.

Life
Syedna Sheikh Adam was born in 1548 in Vadodara. His father's name was Tayyeb Shah. Syedna Sheikh Adam obtained elementary education in Vadodara and went to Ahmedabad to pursue further education. He further studied in Yemen under Syedna Yusuf Najmuddin ibn Sulaiman. After the death of Syedna Yusuf, Syedna Sheikh Adam returned to India and served under Syedna Dawood Bin Ajabshah who sent him to Deccan Plateau to review affairs. One of the most noteworthy service was to debate Sulayman bin Hasan claims.

Succession
His tenure lasted 9 years and 21 days and is buried in Ahmedabad. As per the Dawoodi Bohra faction, Syedna Sheikh Adam Safiuddin appointed or gave nass to Syedna Abduttayyeb Zakiuddin.

References

Further reading 
Daftary, Farhad, The Ismaili, Their History and Doctrine (Chapter -Mustalian Ismailism- p. 300-310)
Lathan, Young, Religion, Learning and Science
Bacharach, Joseph W. Meri, Medieval Islamic Civilisation

Dawoodi Bohra da'is
Dawoodi Bohras
1622 deaths
Year of birth unknown
17th-century Ismailis